Mauritia may refer to:
Mauritia, a genus of fan palms
Mauritia (gastropod), a genus of snails
Mauritia (microcontinent), a proposed land mass that existed between India and Madagascar

See also
Mauritian (disambiguation)
Mauritius